Devarakonda is a town in the Nalgonda district of the Indian state of Telangana. It is a municipality in Devarakonda mandal of Devarakonda division.

Demographics
According to the 2001 India census, Devarakonda has a population of 37,434. Males constitute 53% of the population and females 47%. Devarakonda has an average literacy rate of 72%, higher than the national average of 59.5%: male literacy is 81% and female literacy is 63%. In Devarakonda, 12% of the population is under 6 years of age.

References

Forts in Telangana
Cities and towns in Nalgonda district
Mandal headquarters in Nalgonda district